Barinka is a surname. Notable people with the surname include:

 Michal Barinka (born 1984), Czech ice hockey player
 Peter Barinka (born 1977), Slovak ice hockey player